The 2017 Jiffy Lube Alberta Scotties Tournament of Hearts, Alberta's provincial women's curling championship, was held from January 25 to 29 at the St. Albert Curling Club in St. Albert, Alberta. The winning Shannon Kleibrink team represented Alberta at the 2017 Scotties Tournament of Hearts in St. Catharines.

The 2006 Winter Olympics bronze medallist Shannon Kleibrink and her Okotoks, Alberta-based team never trailed in the final game against Val Sweeting. It was Kleibrink's fifth career provincial championship, but the first for her teammates. Kleibrink had missed a few games due to a back injury following a routine work-out session and was replaced by two-time Scotties champion Heather Nedohin. For Sweeting, her loss in the final was the second time in a row, as she had lost to Chelsea Carey in the final of the 2016 Alberta Scotties Tournament of Hearts.

Organizers of the event were pleased with the turnout of the event. It was the first provincial Scotties to be held in St. Albert since 1984.

Qualification Process
This is how the 12 teams qualified:

Teams
The teams are listed as follows:

Knockout brackets

A Event

B Event

C Event

Playoffs

A vs B
Saturday, January 28, 6:30pm

C1 vs C2
Saturday, January 28, 6:30pm

Semifinal
Sunday, January 29, 11:00am

Final
Sunday, January 29, 5:00 pm

References

https://web.archive.org/web/20170131194803/http://2017jiffylubescotties.msa4.rampinteractive.com/content/draws

Scotties Tournament of Hearts, 2017
Alberta
Scotties Tournament of Hearts
January 2017 sports events in Canada
Sport in St. Albert, Alberta